The Dutch–Bone wars (1824–1906) were a series of conflicts between the Netherlands and the Bone state in southern Sulawesi (Celebes).

First Bone War (1824–25)
Second Bone War (1859–60)
Third Bone War (1905–06)

References